Pippin or Pepin may refer to:

Arts and entertainment
 Pippin (comics), a children's comic produced from 1966 to 1986
 Pippin (musical), a Broadway musical by Stephen Schwartz loosely based on the life of Pepin the Hunchback
 Pippin Took, character from The Lord of the Rings
 Pippin,  dog from 1993 children’s TV show Come Outside
 The Short Reign of Pippin IV, a novel by John Steinbeck

People
 Pepin of Landen (c. 580–640), nicknamed the Elder, sometimes listed as a saint
 Pepin of Herstal (c. 635–714), nicknamed the Middle
 Pepin the Short or Pippin the Younger (c. 714–768), father of Charlemagne
 Pepin the Hunchback (c. 769 – 811), first son of Charlemagne
 Pepin of Italy (777–810), second son of Charlemagne, born Carloman and later named Pepin
 Pepin I of Aquitaine (797–838), grandson of Charlemagne, son of Louis the Pious
 Pepin II of Aquitaine (823–864), son of Pepin I of Aquitaine
 Pepin, Count of Vermandois (817–850), grandson of Pepin of Italy
 Pippin (name), given name and surname, including Pepin

Places
 Pepin, Iran, a village in Mazandaran Province, Iran
 Pepin Island, New Zealand
 Pepin County, Wisconsin, U.S.
 Pepin (town), Wisconsin
 Pepin, Wisconsin, a village near the town
 Lake Pepin, Minnesota, U.S.
 Pepin Township, Wabasha County, Minnesota, U.S.

Others
 Apple Pippin, multimedia technology platform
 Cincinnati Pippins, a team in the United States Baseball League
 Pépin's test to determine whether a Fermat number is prime in mathematics
 Pippin (roller coaster), earlier version of Kennywood's Thunderbolt roller coaster that opened in 1924
 Pippin apple, a kind of apple, any of several cultivars, sometimes referred to as pippin
 Yakima Valley Pippins, American baseball team
 Zippin Pippin, a roller coaster

See also
 Saint Pepin (disambiguation)